Kuldur is an urban locality (a resort settlement)  in  Obluchensky District of the Jewish Autonomous Oblast, Russia. Population:

References

Urban-type settlements in the Jewish Autonomous Oblast